Emporium Mall is a shopping center located at Pluit, Jakarta, Indonesia. Emporium Pluit developed by PT. Pluit Propertindo a subsidiary of Agung Podomoro Land. The mall is located at Jl. Pluit Selatan Raya and Jl. Bridge Three, in North Jakarta. This location was previously complex Sasana Krida Sports Complex.

Emporium Pluit Mall was officially opened to the public on January 10, 2009. This mall is part of the 10 hectare CBD Pluit superblock consisting of malls, condominiums, housing, office buildings and a hotel.

This mall has a floor area of  consisting of 2 basement floors, 5 main floors, and 3 floors for indoor parking area. The main tenants are Carrefour hypermarkets and Sogo department store. Some other tenants include: Gramedia, Emporium Pluit XXI, Electronic Solution, BreadTalk, J.CO, Ace Hardware and Starbucks. The food court area is located on the 4th floor, but there are also several restaurants on the other floors.

See also

List of shopping malls in Indonesia

External links

References

Shopping malls in Jakarta
Post-independence architecture of Indonesia
North Jakarta